The 2016–17 Sunfoil Series was a first-class cricket competition that took place in South Africa from 5 October 2016 to 12 February 2017. The competition was split into two halves, with the first group of fixtures played in October and November, and the remaining matches played January and February. The series was played alongside the tournament for provincial teams, the Sunfoil 3-Day Cup. Knights won the tournament with an innings victory in their final match.

Squads

Points table

Group stage

Fixtures

Round 1

Round 2

Round 3

Round 4

Round 5

Round 6

Round 7

Round 8

Round 9

Round 10

References

External links
 Series home at ESPN Cricinfo

South African domestic cricket competitions
Sunfoil Series
2016–17 South African cricket season
Sunfoil Series